Vasyl Ihorovych Klimov (born 26 June 1986 in Kremenchuk, Poltava Oblast) is a Ukrainian football midfielder.

Club history
Vasyl Klimov began his football career in Atlanta-86 school in Kremenchuk. At age 17 he was signed by Dnipro-2 Dnipropetrovsks. He transferred to FC Kremin Kremenchuk during 2008 summer transfer window.

Career statistics

References

External links

  Profile – Official Kremin site
  FC Kremin Kremenchuk Squad on the PFL website
  Profile on the FFU website
  Profile Unofficial Vorskla site

1986 births
Living people
FC Kremin Kremenchuk players
FC Vorskla Poltava players
FC Dnipro players
PFC Sumy players
Ukrainian footballers
Ukrainian Premier League players
FC Nyva Vinnytsia players
Association football midfielders
People from Kremenchuk
Sportspeople from Poltava Oblast
21st-century Ukrainian people